Arthur Lowe (1915-1982) was an English actor.

Arthur Lowe may also refer to:

 Arthur Lowe (tennis) (1886–1958), English tennis player
 Arthur Lowe (painter) (1865–1940), English artist
 Arthur Lowe (footballer) (1906–1950), Australian rules footballer
 Arthur Rylands Lowe (1873–1924), British accountant

See also
 Lowe (disambiguation)
 List of people with surname Lowe